Ave Suija (born 16 April 1969) is an Estonian lichenologist. The lichenicolous fungus species Capronia suijae was named in her honour in 2017.

See also
 :Category:Taxa named by Ave Suija

References

1969 births
Estonian mycologists
Lichenologists
Living people
University of Tartu alumni
Academic staff of the University of Tartu
Women lichenologists
Women mycologists